Harry Wüstenhagen (11 January 1928 – 11 December 1999) was a German film actor. He appeared in 45 films between 1953 and 1988. He was born in Berlin, Germany and died in Florida. Wüstenhagen was the German dubbing voice for Sherlock Holmes in Sherlock Holmes and the Deadly Necklace (1962), A Study in Terror (1965), The Seven-Per-Cent Solution (1976), The Hound of the Baskervilles (1983) and The Sign of Four (1983).

Selected filmography

 Rumpelstiltskin (1955)
 Max and Moritz (1956)
 Mischief in Wonderland (1957)
 Precocious Youth (1957)
 Confess, Doctor Corda (1958)
 The Green Archer (1961)
 The Dead Eyes of London (1961)
 The Black Abbot (1963)
 The Curse of the Hidden Vault (1964)
 A Mission for Mr. Dodd (1964)
 The Hound of Blackwood Castle (1968)
 The Man with the Glass Eye (1969)
 Die Feuerzangenbowle (1970)
 Unterwegs nach Atlantis (1982, TV series)

External links

1928 births
1999 deaths
German male film actors
German male television actors
German male voice actors
Male actors from Berlin
20th-century German male actors